The  singles competition of the 2006 Hastings Direct International Championships was part of the 32nd edition of the Eastbourne International tennis tournament, Tier II of the 2006 WTA Tour. Kim Clijsters was the defending champion but lost in the semifinals to Justine Henin-Hardenne. Henin-Hardenne won in the final 4–6, 6–1, 7–6(7–5) against Anastasia Myskina.

Seeds
A champion seed is indicated in bold text while text in italics indicates the round in which that seed was eliminated. The top four seeds received a bye to the second round.

  Amélie Mauresmo (second round)
  Kim Clijsters (semifinals)
  Justine Henin-Hardenne (champion)
  Svetlana Kuznetsova (semifinals)
  Anastasia Myskina (final)
  Francesca Schiavone (quarterfinals)
  Anna-Lena Grönefeld (quarterfinals)
  Daniela Hantuchová (first round)

Draw

Final

Section 1

Section 2

External links
 2006 Hastings Direct International Championships Draw

Singles
Hastings Direct International Championships